The Miyoshi Mononoke Museum, also known as the Yumoto Koichi Memorial Japan Yōkai Museum, or shortened to the Yōkai Museum, is located in Miyoshi, Hiroshima Prefecture, Japan. The museum collection holds over 5,000 artworks and objects that represent yōkai, supernatural beings in Japanese folklore. It was founded in 2019 by Yumoto Kōichi, a scholar of yōkai who has also written numerous books on the subject of Japanese monsters and supernatural entities and mythological creatures.

The museum is located at 1691-4 Miyoshimachi, in Miyoshi City. The two-story museum building is constructed in steel, and was designed by K Structural Research Institute. The ground floor of the museum features an entrance hall, reception area, museum shop and an exhibition hall that houses the permanent collection as well as changing special exhibitions and a "hands-on" gallery. The second floor of the museum includes a conference room, work and training room and collection storage.

Examples of Yōkai

See also
 Ayakashi (yōkai)
 Japanese folklore
 List of legendary creatures from Japan
 Mononoke
 Yōkai
 Yōsei
 Yūrei

References

Museums in Hiroshima Prefecture
Yōkai
Museums established in 2019
Folklore
Museums of Japanese culture
2019 establishments in Japan